Electronic Document Transfer (EDT) Hub captures documents and distributes them electronically to any GP practice or organisation connected to it.  EDT Hub is used widely within the NHS, in England where it is currently being used within over forty NHS Trusts.  EDT is also deployed throughout the NHS in Scotland EDT Hub comes in two versions, uni-directional and multi-directional.  Uni-directional hubs allow one way transfers of documents from a source (in a hospital) to an end point (the patient's General Practitioner).  Multi-directional hubs allow document transfers to happen between any end points,  The EDT Hub can be fully integrated with the Docman document management system and can be used with other clinical systems currently deployed within the NHS.

EDT Hub has ability to link multiple secondary care organisations (such as hospitals) with multiple primary care organisations (such as GP Surgeries), and saves the NHS money because it reduces paper consumption and printing costs whilst speeding up delivery and reducing the risk of document loss. 

EDT Hub is being used by  NHS Eastern and Coastal Kent and NHS Medway to transfer 900,000 documents electronically.
Hospitals in  NHS Surrey are also sending documents electronically to GP practices  and also  Coventry and Warwickshire and  Herefordshire PCT are delivering to GP practices via EDT Hub.
 
Documents typically handled by EDT Hub include:

Discharge Summaries
Discharge Letters
Encounter Reports
Radiology Reports
Outpatient Clinic Letters
Out-of-Hours Reports

This product is notable as one of the first of its kind to be granted NHS Interoperability Toolkit Accreditation.

References 

  NHS Interoperability Toolkit
 Hub for Ashford and St Peters NHS Foundation Trust
 Kent
 Surrey
  Warwickshire
  Herefordshire PCT

External links 
 Docman.

Document management systems